This is a list of institutes of special education in Pakistan.

Institutes for Blind (Visually Impaired Children), Punjab

Karachi
 Blind Resource Foundation Pakistan (http://www.brfpakistan.org/)
 The Effort Rehabilitation and Vocational Centre for Special Children Garden West karachi 
 Ida Rieu School
IBP - School of Special Education
Nai Subah - Institute for Persons with visual impairment
(C-ARTS) - Center for Autism Rehabilitation and Training, Sindh (C-ARTS)

Faisalabad
 Institute for Hearing Impaired/Intellectually Challenged and Physically Challenged Kids.   Tanzeem al-Lissan - Eid Bagh, Dhobi Ghat, Faisalabad (http://al-lissan.org) 041-2601487

Lahore

List of Schools for Special Children in Lahore

See also
Special education department (Punjab, Pakistan)

References

External links
 Special Education Department  official website
 Special Education Institutes in the Punjab

Pakistan education-related lists
Institutions
Lists of special schools